The Fourteenth Van Cliburn International Piano Competition took place in Fort Worth, Texas from May 24 to June 9, 2013. It was won by Ukrainian pianist Vadym Kholodenko.

Jury
  John Giordano (chairman)
  Dmitri Alexeev
  Michel Beroff
  Andrea Bonatta
  Richard Dyer 
  Joseph Kalichstein
  Yoheved Kaplinsky
  Liu Shih Kun
  Minoru Kojima
  Menahem Pressler
  Blanca Uribe
  Arie Vardi
  Xian Zhang

Awards

 Finalists were awarded $10,000 and a 3-season concert tour and management, semifinalists $5,000 and preliminary competitors $1,000.

Results

References

External links
 Results at the competition's official website

Van Cliburn International Piano Competition